Karydopita (Greek: Καρυδόπιτα) is a Greek dessert cake made primarily from walnuts and covered in a sweet syrup. Its name is a compound word which derives from "karýdia" (Greek for walnuts) and "pita" (Greek for pie).

There are several variations of the dish, with unique ingredients used in both the syrup and cake. Some common additions include, but are not limited to, orange zest, cloves, brown sugar, and spiced rum or cognac.

It is one of the most common glyka tapsiou - dessert dishes like pies and breads baked in baking pans. Other common desserts of this style are galaktoboureko, amygdalopita and kadaifi.

References

Greek pastries